Secret Annex may mean:

 Act of Seclusion, also described as a secret annex to the Treaty of Westminster
 Anne Frank House, which contained the secret annex in which the Frank family lived in hiding